Sarah Brüßler (born 1994) is a German sprint canoeist. She competed at the 2020 Summer Olympics, in the Women's K-2 500 metres.

Career 
She is studying at University of Mannheim.
She participated at the 2018 ICF Canoe Sprint World Championships, winning a medal. and 2019 ICF Canoe Sprint World Championships,

References

External links 

 02 August 2021, Japan, Tokio: Canoe: Olympics, heats, kayak double, 500 m, Stock Photo, | agefotostock

Living people
1994 births
German female canoeists
ICF Canoe Sprint World Championships medalists in kayak
Canoeists at the 2020 Summer Olympics
Olympic canoeists of Germany